Lamentations is the debut studio album by Papua New Guinea-born Australian-based singer Ngaiire, released on 12 July 2013. The album is named was derived from two sources of inspiration; Dido's Lament written by English Baroque composer Henry Purcell performed in his opera Dido and Aeneas and the Biblical and poetic Book of Lamentations mourning the destructive fall of Jerusalem.

Reception

Chris Downton from BMA Magazine said "an impressive introduction to Joseph's powerful and beguiling vocals, which smoothly shift throughout retro chanteuse and more contemporary R&B, but as the title suggests, there's an undercurrent of melancholy lurking beneath much of this album."

Cameron Adams from The Daily Telegraph described the album as "electronic but soulful, innovative but accessible and a timeless mating of genres".

Rip It Up magazine called it "poignant" and "melancholic", as well as "invoking a sense of empathy and understanding".

The Music AU said "Infused with emotion and bursting with talent, Lamentations is a stunning work."

Lulu Ray from Happy Mag said the album "has a depth and darkness to its soundscape that is both unexpected and appreciated." An Amazon editor called the album "Beautiful and well-rounded... [and] a mature and evocative debut."

Sosefina Fuamoli from The AU Review called the album "a wild and eclectic fusion of soul, beats and R&B."

Track listing

Release history

References

2013 debut albums
Ngaiire albums